The 2009–10 season of the Tunisian Ligue Professionnelle 2 began on 16 August 2009 and ended on 27 May 2009. AS Marsa became champions of the 2009–10 season and were promoted to the 2009–10 CLP-1 along with AS Gabès who finished in runners-up.

Team Movements

Teams promoted to 2009–10 CLP-1
 ES Zarzis
 JS Kairouanaise

Teams relegated from 2008–09 CLP-1
 AS Marsa
 Jendouba Sport

Teams promoted from 2008–09 CLP-3
EA Mateur
LPTA Tozeur

Teams relegated to 2009–10 CLP-3
 SA Menzel Bourguiba
 STIR S Zarzouna

Member clubs 2009-10
AS Djerba
AS Gabès
AS Marsa
CS Korba
CS M'saken
EA Mateur
EM Mahdia
ES Beni-Khalled
Jendouba Sport
LPTA Tozeur
Olympique du Kef
SA Menzel Bourguiba
Stade Gabèsien
US Ben Guerdane

Table

Television rights
The Communication bureau of the FTF attributed the broadcasting rights of the Tunisian Ligue Professionnelle 2 to Hannibal TV.

External links
Soccerway.com
2009–10 Ligue 2 at rsssf.com

Tun
Tunisian Ligue Professionnelle 2 seasons
2009–10 in Tunisian football